Nawabzada Mir Haji Lashkari Khan Raisani is a Baloch politician and the former senator. He is member of Balochistan National Party (Mengal), the former member of Pakistan Muslim League and former President of the Pakistan Peoples Party for Balochistan as of 2010. He served as a senator in the Senate of Pakistan from 2009 to 2015.

He is the son of former governor Balochistan Nawab Ghous Baksh Raisani. He is the older brother of late Shaheed Nawabzada Mir Siraj Khan Raisani who died in a suicide bomb blast in his hometown Mastung.

Muhammad Aslam Khan Raisani and Siraj Raisani are his siblings among others.

References 

Members of the Provincial Assembly of Balochistan
Balochistan National Party (Mengal) politicians
People from Balochistan, Pakistan
Pakistan People's Party politicians
1961 births
Living people
Date of birth missing (living people)